Bohdan "Bo" Poraj-Pstrokonski is a British-Polish actor, known for his film and television appearances, including the BBC sitcom Miranda.

Career
Between 2012 and 2014, Poraj played the role of Mike Jackford in the BBC sitcom Miranda. In 2013, he made a guest  appearance in Vicious. In 2014, he played the role of Bonacieux in the BBC series The Musketeers. Poraj has also written five to seven episodes of Doctors, as well as three episodes of EastEnders. Poraj also appeared in an episode of Doctors in December 2022 as Gregory Painter.

Personal life
Poraj's parents are Polish. They moved to the United Kingdom before he was born.

Poraj studied at RADA. He lives in Loughton, Essex, with his wife, actress Natasha Little. The couple have two sons.

Theatre

Filmography

References

External links

1973 births
Living people
English people of Polish descent
Alumni of RADA
People from Leytonstone
British male film actors
British male stage actors
British male television actors
Place of birth missing (living people)
British soap opera writers
20th-century British male actors
21st-century British male actors
Male actors from London
British male television writers